Chippenham Fen and Snailwell Poor's Fen is a  biological Site of Special Scientific Interest south-east of Fordham in Cambridgeshire, England. It is a Nature Conservation Review site, Grade I, a Ramsar wetland site and a Special Area of Conservation (part of the multi-site Fenland SAC). It is managed by Natural England.

The site is described by Natural England as "of national importance for its wide range of wetland habitats and associated birds and insects". It has diverse habitats and flora, with several uncommon species in damp meadows. It also has many species of breeding birds, and rare spiders and moths.

Access is by permit, which is only available for people conducting research on the site.

References

Sites of Special Scientific Interest in Cambridgeshire
Nature Conservation Review sites
Special Areas of Conservation in England
Ramsar sites in England